The Eagle Newspaper Office is a historic commercial complex in Delano, Minnesota, United States, comprising three adjacent buildings constructed 1883–1885.  It served as the headquarters of the Delano Eagle newspaper and a print shop specializing in railroad and commercial printing, as well as bookbinding.  It was listed on the National Register of Historic Places in 1979 for having local significance in the theme of communication.  It was nominated as the home of Delano's oldest business and a newspaper that had served the community continuously since its founding in 1872.

Description
The three sections of the Eagle Newspaper Office are constructed of red brick in simplified Italianate style.  The western section is the original, built in 1883.  The eastern building was constructed in 1884 and the central in 1885.

See also
 Basin Republican-Rustler Printing Building
 Pocahontas Times Print Shop
 National Register of Historic Places listings in Wright County, Minnesota

References

Newspaper buildings
Buildings and structures in Wright County, Minnesota
Commercial buildings on the National Register of Historic Places in Minnesota
Commercial buildings completed in 1885
Defunct newspaper companies of the United States
Italianate architecture in Minnesota
National Register of Historic Places in Wright County, Minnesota
Newspaper headquarters in the United States
Printing in the United States